White waterlily can mean:

 Nymphaea alba, of Europe and North Africa
 Nymphaea lotus, of East Africa and Southeast Asia
 Nymphaea nouchali, of South Asia, Southeast Asia and Northern Australia
 Nymphaea odorata, of North America
 Nymphaea pubescens, of South Asia and Southeast Asia